Cognetics Corporation was founded in 1983.

History 
Cognetics commercialised The Interactive Encyclopedia System, as HyperTIES. HyperTIES was a forerunner of the World Wide Web, and one of the first commercial hypertext systems.

Cognetics also developed Amnesia, a text adventure game for the PC, Apple II and Commodore 64.

References

External links 
 

Companies established in 1983
Information technology consulting firms of the United States